The Palaeobotanical Garden is a natural reserve in the town of Mata, in the state of Rio Grande do Sul, Brazil.

Description

Fossil natural reserve with an area of 36,000 m². Petrified wood in its original location. This in Caturrita Formation of Upper Triassic.

Citations

Reference bibliography 
Os Fascinantes Caminhos da Paleontologia.  Author: Antônio Isaia. Paleontologists tell the stories of Santa Maria and the region. 60 pages. Editora Pallotti (Portuguese).
Cronologia Histórica de Santa Maria e do extinto município de São Martinho. 1787–1933. Vol I. Author: Romeu Beltrão, Editora Pallotti, 1958 (Portuguese).

External links

 Brazilian Society of Paleontology

Paleontological sites of Brazil
Historical geology
Triassic paleontological sites
Mesozoic paleontological sites of South America